Aquadoodle is an activity drawing toy primarily for preschool aged children. The patented invention is based on a hydrochromic ink which causes color change when the user draws with a water filled pen. The user's drawings will remain for several minutes before gradually disappearing.

The hydrochromic ink technology was created by the Pilot Ink Company of Japan [Patent http://www.google.com/patents/about?id=8s0KAAAAEBAJ&dq=6416853], a subsidiary division of the Pilot Pen Company. The product was introduced to Spinmaster Ltd. by toy consultant/inventor David Fuhrer, President of Funanuf, who was instrumental in securing a licensing and distribution agreement for Spin Master to market the toy in North America and other select markets around the world in 2003. Aquadoodle has become the #1 selling preschool activity toy in the world and has won numerous awards including the TOTY (Activity Toy Of The Year), the US toy industry's most prestigious award.

Toy brands
Water toys